Gerald M. Shapiro (born 1942 in Philadelphia) is an American composer of acoustic and electronic music.

Shapiro studied first at the Eastman School of Music, where he received a Bachelor of Music degree with distinction in 1964. He then did graduate work at Mills College, where he received an M.A. in 1967, the University of California, Davis, the San Francisco Tape Music Center, and in Paris at the Conservatoire Nationale de Musique and the École Normale Supérieure de Musique. His principal composition teachers were Darius Milhaud, Morton Subotnick, Karlheinz Stockhausen, Olivier Messiaen, and Nadia Boulanger. Since 1967 he has taught at Brown University, where he is currently Professor of Music. His compositions have been performed throughout the United States and Europe, and are recorded on the Naxos and Neuma labels.

Compositions (selective list)
 Antiphonies I, for piano and tape (1965)
 Winter Birch, for interactive audience participation and live electronics (1972)
 The Voice of the Dharma, for a cappella choir (1978)
 Nocturne, for chamber orchestra (1981)
 Phoenix, for vocal quartet and live electronics (1987)
 Trio No. 1, for violin, cello, and piano (1993)
 In Time's Shadow, for orchestra (1994)
 String Quartet No. 2 (1994)
 Epithalamium, for string quartet (1997)
 Mouvements perpetuels, for percussion quartet (1998)
 Trio No. 2, for violin, cello, and piano (2004)

External links
 Composer's Brown University webpage

1942 births
Living people
20th-century classical composers
21st-century classical composers
American male classical composers
American classical composers
Conservatoire de Paris alumni
Musicians from Philadelphia
Eastman School of Music alumni
University of California, Davis alumni
Pupils of Darius Milhaud
Pupils of Karlheinz Stockhausen
21st-century American composers
20th-century American composers